Eudokia (or Eudocia) Ingerina (c. 840 – c. 882) was a Byzantine empress as the wife of the Byzantine emperor Basil I, the mistress of his predecessor Michael III, and the mother of emperors Leo VI and Alexander, as well as the mother of Patriarch Stephen I of Constantinople.

Family

Eudokia was the daughter of Inger, who was probably a Varangian, while her mother was a member of a prominent Greek family, the Martinakoi, who claimed imperial ancestry, or according to a later alternative reconstruction by Christian Settipani, her connection to the Martinakoi came through her father, whom he identifies as a Byzantine noble, Inger Martinakios, logothete.

Life

Because her family was iconoclastic, the Empress Mother Theodora strongly disapproved of them. Around 855, Eudokia became the mistress of Theodora's son, Michael III, who thus incurred the anger of his mother and the powerful minister Theoktistos. Unable to risk a major scandal by leaving his wife, Michael married Eudokia to his friend Basil but continued his relationship with her.  Basil was compensated with the emperor's sister Thekla as his own mistress.

Eudokia gave birth to a son, Leo, in September 866 and another, Stephen, in November 867. They were officially Basil's children, but this paternity was questioned, apparently even by Basil himself. The strange promotion of Basil to co-emperor in May 866 lends support to the great probability that at least Leo was actually Michael III's illegitimate son.  The parentage of Eudokia's younger children is not a subject of dispute, as Michael III was murdered in September 867.

A decade into Basil's reign, Eudokia became involved with another man, whom the emperor ordered to be tonsured as monk. In 882, she selected Theophano as wife for her son Leo, and died shortly afterwards.

Children
Eudokia and Basil officially had six children:
 Leo VI (19 September 866 – 11 May 912), who succeeded as emperor and according to the majority view of scholars was a son of Michael III.
 Stephen I (November 867 – 18 May 893), patriarch of Constantinople, who according to the majority view of scholars was a son of Michael III.
 Alexander (c. 870 – 6 June 913), who succeeded as emperor in 912.
Anna (d. 905/12 or after). A nun the convent of St Euphemia, Petron.
Helen (d. 905/12 or after). A nun the convent of St Euphemia, Petron.
Maria (d. 905/12 or after). A nun the convent of St Euphemia, Petron.

Sources

Cyril Mango, "Eudocia Ingerina, the Normans, and the Macedonian Dynasty," Zbornik Radova Vizantološkog Instituta, XIV-XV, 1973, 17–27.

See also

List of Byzantine emperors
List of Roman and Byzantine empresses

References

840s births
882 deaths
Varangians
Burials at the Church of the Holy Apostles
Phrygian dynasty
Macedonian dynasty
Mistresses of Byzantine royalty
9th-century Byzantine empresses
Mothers of Byzantine emperors